Nassim Dehouche (born August 12, 1982 in Béjaïa, Algeria) is an Algerian footballer. He currently plays as a midfielder for MC El Eulma in the Algerian Ligue Professionnelle 2.

Honours
 Won the Algerian League once with JS Kabylie in 2008

External links
 
 

1982 births
Algeria A' international footballers
Algerian footballers
Living people
Kabyle people
JS Kabylie players
JSM Béjaïa players
CA Bordj Bou Arréridj players
Footballers from Béjaïa
Algerian Ligue Professionnelle 1 players
Algerian Ligue 2 players
MC El Eulma players
MO Béjaïa players
Association football midfielders
21st-century Algerian people